This is a list of electronics projects published in Radio-Electronics magazine under the "Build This" heading.

1980

1981

1982

1983

References

Electronics lists